William Beck is a British actor, known for his appearances in the BBC drama series Robin Hood and Casualty.

Early life 
Beck has a family history of employment in medicine and states that his earliest memories are of hospitals. This encouraged him to join medical school, which he later quit, despite maintaining an interest. On quitting medical school, Beck explained, "I didn't give up medical school because I couldn't do it, I just think at that age I got bored with things very quickly." He added that he did not want to waste time and resources after realising he did not want to continue.

Career 
After deciding to quit medical school, Beck pursued a career in acting. He was inspired to become an actor by some people he met during medical school. His move to acting was criticised as it was thought that Beck was "giving up the most secure profession for perhaps the least secure". Beck has since featured in films Northanger Abbey, Snatch and Goal II: Living the Dream, as well as drama series Red Cap, Robin Hood and Vital Signs. Beck felt "fortunate" to receive such employment and was pleased to "work pretty consistently over the last 10 years". In March 2011, he stated that his favourite job was Robin Hood, praising his fellow cast members. His character was killed off early in the series, disappointing Beck. Beck also starred in The Suspicions of Mr Whicher, which he felt gave him the opportunity to learn from other actors.

Beck was introduced as "shambolic" consultant Dylan Keogh in the BBC medical drama Casualty in March 2011. The actor felt that his medical school background helped him in his role. He left the drama in 2012 and Dylan departed in December. Two years later, Beck reprised the role and Dylan returned in October 2014. The actor told David Brown of the Radio Times that he found it strange to return to Casualty, but looked forward to portraying the character again.

Filmography

Theatre
 They Shoot Horses, Don't They? (1999)
 Kes (2004) 
 Festen (2004)
 The Tragedy of Thomas Hobbes (2008)
 The Merchant of Venice (2008) 
 The Taming of the Shrew (2008)
 Arthur & George (2010)

Radio
 Filthy Rich: A BBC Radio 4 Dramatisation

References

External links
 

Year of birth missing (living people)
Living people
British male television actors